KBSC-LP, UHF analog channel 49, was a low-powered television station licensed to  Brookings, Oregon, United States. The station was owned by the Fred McCutchan Family Trust. On cable, the station was carried on Charter Cable channel 9.

Most of KBSC's programming was locally produced.

History
KBSC-LP was founded March 16, 1992, when the FCC granted a construction permit for K49DH to Daniel C. McGrath. The translator went on the air November 1, 1992, broadcasting programming from HomeNet and Main Street TV.

In 1995, the station became affiliated with The WB and American Independent Network. On November 20, 1995, K49DH became KBSC-LP.

On August 6, 1997, KBSC-LP was sold to Pacific Coast Communications, LLC. Network programming was dropped in favor of local programming.

On April 28, 1999, KBSC-LP was sold to Oregon Coast Television Network, Inc. In 2001, KBSC-LP affiliated with the America One network.

On September 11, 2003, the station's license was transferred to Oregon Coast Media, Inc.

On December 13, 2006, KBSC-LP was sold to the Fred McCutchan Family Trust.

KBSC-LP's license was cancelled by the FCC on March 19, 2015 for failure to file a license renewal application.

External links
Official site

Defunct television stations in the United States
BSC-LP
Brookings, Oregon
Crescent City, California
Television channels and stations established in 1992
1992 establishments in Oregon
Television channels and stations disestablished in 2015
2015 disestablishments in Oregon
BSC-LP